The Temptations is a four-hour television miniseries broadcast in two-hour halves on NBC, based upon the history of one of Motown's longest-lived acts, The Temptations. Executive produced by former Motown executive Suzanne de Passe, produced by Otis Williams and Temptations manager Shelley Berger, and based upon Williams’ Temptations autobiography, the miniseries was originally broadcast on November 1 and November 2, 1998. It was filmed on location in Pittsburgh, Pennsylvania, in the spring of 1998. Allan Arkush directed the miniseries.

Overview
The miniseries was based upon Otis Williams' book; as such, it came from his perspective: the focus of the story tended to be on Williams and Melvin Franklin, with David Ruffin and Eddie Kendricks seen as antagonists for much of the second half (although Kendricks was still given a more sympathetic portrayal than Ruffin). Dennis Edwards was not heavily focused upon, nor was much said of the problems he later had with Otis Williams. Nevertheless, the miniseries gave a general overview of both the history of the group and that of Motown, and, thanks to de Passe's connection, the film was able to use authentic props and locations.

A number of liberties were taken with factual events for dramatization purposes:
In the miniseries, during a 1964 New Year's Motown party, Al Bryant is reluctant to perform another encore, and is fired from the group following a backstage altercation with Bryant throwing a beer bottle at Paul Williams. In reality, the incident happened in October 1963, but it was Williams who was reluctant to do another encore. Bryant would be fired two months later for being uncooperative following an annual Christmas party. 
The group's trademark four-headed microphone doesn't debut until Edwards joins the group, but in reality, it debuted in 1966 and in fact, Ruffin was responsible for creating it. 
The miniseries shows David Ruffin developing ego problems and suggesting to change the band's name to "David Ruffin and the Tempations" in early 1966. In reality, it did not happen until late 1967 when The Supremes were re-branded as "Diana Ross and the Supremes".
In the miniseries, Edwards is visibly angered when Ruffin steals his microphone during a concert performance. In actuality, Edwards claims he gave the microphone and was appreciative for Ruffin's presence. 
While the miniseries dramatically and somewhat accurately portrays Paul Williams's death by suicide, in real life he was found dead in an alley in a car, and not in a parking lot as portrayed. 
In the miniseries it stated that the Temptations left Atlantic Records after recording one album.  They actually recorded two albums for Atlantic; Hear to Tempt You in 1977 and Bare Back in 1978.
Another inaccuracy is the depiction of Ruffin, Kendricks, and Edwards performing together before the 1982 reunion tour; in reality, Ruffin and Kendricks did not start performing together until 1985, with Edwards joining them in 1989 after the group was inducted into the Rock and Roll Hall of Fame. 
David Ruffin was not found dead (after being unceremoniously dumped out of a car) near a hospital, and then taken to a morgue where he would not be properly identified for a week. In reality, he had suffered a drug overdose, and was taken to the hospital by his chauffeur who notified attending staff of Ruffin's identity. Because no one claimed his body immediately after his death, his corpse lay in the morgue for two days; once Ruffin's family was informed of his death, they claimed his body the next day.
In the miniseries, Melvin Franklin apparently dies outside of the kitchen in his mother's house. In reality, he died from heart failure at the Cedars-Sinai Medical Center after being admitted following a series of seizures. As Franklin's death was still fresh in the minds of the miniseries' creators (he died in 1995), it was decided that the miniseries would not present Franklin's death as it actually occurred.

As a result, Otis Williams and the producers would be sued by several people portrayed in the film and their families, notably Melvin Franklin's mother and the children and estate of David Ruffin.

Although the movie is set mostly in Detroit and Los Angeles, the producers chose to shoot the film in Pittsburgh, presumably to take advantage of the many different architectural and geographical looks that Pittsburgh offers. de Passe Entertainment had, some six years earlier, shot The Jacksons: An American Dream in Pittsburgh as well.

Plot

Part one (November 1, 1998)
The story begins in 1958 when Otis Williams, at the time a teenager, is running to meet his friend Elbridge "Al" Bryant at a musical performance by The Cadillacs, where Otis and the singer lock eyes, which he credits as the moment he devoted his life to music. After the concert, Otis and Al go to a barber where they get the Tony Curtis and DA-style process. Later, Otis arrives home for dinner, where his stepfather is angered by his hairstyle and pressures him to go to work at the assembly line instead of going into music, which Otis heatedly rejects. Six months later, Otis, Al and two new band members, are singing on a street corner when they see another group of singers, the Voicemasters, across the street, and are impressed by one singer's bass voice type. The next day after school, Otis spots the singer leaving to walk home, and decides to follow him. The singer sees Otis and begins to run away, thinking him to be a gang member. Otis eventually catches him and introduces himself, finding out that the singer's name is Melvin Franklin, and invites him to join his group, Otis Williams & the Siberians. Melvin agrees, on the condition that his mother approves. After talking to her, Otis convinces Melvin's mother to let him join.

The group, now with five members, are practicing their singing after school one day when they notice a group of girls watching them sing. Upon seeing this, the group follows them while singing "Earth Angel". The girls go their separate ways until one girl, Josephine, remains, and Otis asks her out on a date. The next Saturday, the group are making out with the girls in a milk truck when they hear for their group to come to the radio station, and hastily drive to the station, which turns out to be a run-down apartment. Johnnie May Matthews, the owner of the pirate radio studio in the basement, declares herself their new manager and producer, and also changes their name to Otis Williams and the Distants. In April 1960, the group are waiting to perform at a party where they meet Paul Williams, Eddie Kendricks, singers for The Primes, Diana Ross, lead singer for the Primettes, Smokey Robinson, lead singer of Smokey Robinson & the Miracles, and Berry Gordy, founder and owner of Motown Records. Al arrives late at the party and shows hostility towards Eddie and Paul, while hitting on Diana. The Primes and Primettes perform and the Distants are impressed by their sound. After performing themselves, Otis and Melvin see Berry Gordy entering the bathroom and follow him. After some talking, Berry gives them a business card to contact him later on. Once the party ends, Johnnie shows up in a new car, bought with the money earned from their record, while also showing off rolls of money. Awestruck, they ask about when they get paid, which angers Johnnie and she immediately fires them, kicks them out of the car and drives away. Al and two other members promptly quit the group, leaving Otis and Melvin as the only two remaining members.

Shortly after, Melvin approaches Otis and tells him that Eddie Kendricks and Paul Williams recently left their own group and are interested in joining them. Otis is reluctant to let them join, as he finds them arrogant and cocky, but ultimately accepts when Al rejoins the group. With this new line-up, the group renames themselves the Elgins. Eddie and Paul prove to be valuable members; Paul teaches them how to dance and becomes their unofficial choreographer, while Eddie becomes their falsetto singer. In March 1961, Otis enters Motown Studios, the headquarters of Motown Records, and meets up with Berry Gordy. After the meeting, Otis finds the others waiting outside for an answer. He informs them that Berry will sign them if they can come up with a better group name. After sitting outside the studio for hours waiting to be called in and thinking up a new name, a secretary named Martha Reeves finds them outside and calls them in to meet Berry. When they get to Berry, he asks them for their name, to which Otis replies "The Temptations".

Berry likes the name and agrees to hear them sing. After hearing them perform Oh Mother of Mine (which would become their debut single for Motown) Berry enthusiastically signs them under the Motown label. The group are now in high spirits and make a pact to never leave the group. Otis arrives home to find out that Josephine is pregnant, and although he is shocked, he promises to take responsibility for the baby. In a voiceover, Otis explains that he and Josephine were married shortly after and later gave birth to their son, Lamont. While making moderately successful records written largely by Berry, such as "Paradise" and "I Want a Love I Can See", and getting real choreography from Chollie Atkins, the group start to become known as "The Hitless Temptations" as they can't seem to make a real hit in the first three years under the Motown label. The group start to doubt themselves as talented singers and Al starts to lose his passion for singing and becomes more and more negative and volatile. This comes to a head after performing at a New Year's Eve party, Al smashes Paul in the side of the head with a beer bottle when asked to do an encore on stage. He is kicked out the group immediately. The remaining four go back on stage anyway and perform the classic party song "Shout". While singing, Jimmy Ruffin and his younger brother David Ruffin jump on stage and sing as well. The group are impressed the duos' singing, especially David's. After the party, the four, along with David, go to Melvin's mother's house to eat. While they eat and talk, the four invite David to join the group, which he readily accepts. With five members once again, they make a toast to the future success of the Temptations.

In January 1964, the group head to Hitsville to record a song written for them by Smokey Robinson. The song, called "The Way You Do the Things You Do" becomes an instant hit and puts the Temptations on the map. Shortly after the song hits the charts, the group go on a tour with various other Motown artists, such as the Vandellas, the Miracles, and Marvin Gaye. One afternoon, while changing a tire on the tour bus, a pair of racist Southerners drive by shooting at them with a shotgun, and David and Eddie try in vain to chase them down, but quickly give up. The tour eventually ends and they all arrive back in Detroit. While Josephine is waiting for Otis in front of Hitsville, she sees him with another woman, and assumes that they are having an affair, and storms off. Soon after, the Temptations go on tour again. In November that year, Smokey writes them another song called "My Girl". The song debuts early next year and becomes a massive success, reaching number one on the charts that years. The group enjoys their newfound success and wealth, spending money on themselves and their loved ones.

With this success, however, soon comes trouble. By early 1966, David starts to develop an ego, thinking himself to be solely responsible for the Temptations' success. He also begins using drugs and starts showing up late for rehearsals and meetings, if he shows up at all. This behavior starts to take a toll on the group, and soon after recording "Ain't Too Proud to Beg", Otis and Melvin pay David a visit, staging an intervention. They warned him to clean up his act or else be fired. Later, Berry introduces the group to their new manager, Shelly Berger. Shelly plans to expand the Temptations' fanbase to the mainstream white audience, which they are somewhat reluctant about, as they think their original fans will see them as sell-outs. After some consideration, the Temptations agree and are put on a month-long tour with the Supremes. The tour turns out to be a success and gets them to the Copacabana, although David's destructive behavior continues, and he declares his shady friend, Flynn, his new manager instead of Shelly. Flynn informs the group that David wants to change the group name to "David Ruffin & The Temptations" or else he will not perform, which they reject. David shows up anyway, albeit late, and performs "I'm Losing You" at the Copa, and leaves in a separate limo. After the show, the others take a vote on whether or not they should keep David in the group, and all but Eddie vote to kick him out. Shortly after, David shows up at Hitsville in his limo. While the four watch from a window, Shelly meets David outside and hands him a note informing him of their decision. Upon reading this, David flies into a rage, yelling at them through the window. He then gets into his limo and drives off. Melvin rhetorically asks "So now what"?

Part two (November 2, 1998)
Later in 1968, the Temptations hire Dennis Edwards, an old friend, as a replacement for David. It is around this time that the group enters their psychedelic soul era, started with their 1968 single "Cloud Nine". During a concert performance, the group is about to sing "Ain't Too Proud to Beg" when David jumps on stage and steals the microphone from Dennis and sings himself. The others go along with this to save face, but then chase him backstage afterwards. David and an enraged Otis get into a brief argument that almost becomes physical before getting security guards to escort him out. By 1969, Paul's drinking becomes debilitating and Melvin develops rheumatoid arthritis in the legs and starts taking cortisone shots to ease the symptoms despite his doctor's advice, yet both continue performing anyway. Around this time Otis and Josephine also get a divorce. As Paul's condition gets progressively worse, the others begin to consider whether Paul should retire, at least for the time being. Eddie is against this, as he thinks that they should stick by Paul and be with him at all times, making sure he doesn't drink. In November 1970, Eddie visits David, who begins to turn him against Otis and Melvin while giving him his first shot of cocaine. Shortly after, Paul becomes well enough to sing again, and the Temptations record a new song written by their producer Norman Whitfield called "Just My Imagination". Eddie quits the group after recording the song. Later, Otis and his son Lamont visit Paul at his house. Paul asks to be back in the Temptations, while demonstrating his dancing, almost falling over. Otis tell him that he will be back when he gets better. In June 1972, Norman writes another song called "Papa Was a Rolling Stone", which the group are initially against recording, but eventually go along with it. In a montage set to the song, Paul is seen struggling with his addiction, while fighting with his wife, and later driving around town, ending with Paul committing suicide in a parking lot. Eddie reunites with the others at the funeral, with Melvin telling him that while he's out of the group, they will always be family.

By 1977, the Temptations have moved from Detroit to Los Angeles and have been hit with a dry spell in their career. The group, now with Otis and Melvin as the only remaining original members, fire Shelly as their manager, leave the Motown label and start recording under the Atlantic Records label. Eddie is still under the Motown label and has made two major hits, while David, who has had some hits after the Temptations, is also under a dry spell. One day, while Melvin is helping a woman with her grocery bags, a thief gets in his car and tries to start it. When Melvin tries to stop him, the thief shoots him in both of his legs, kicks him out, and drives off in his car. Melvin tells Otis to go on tour without him, as they need the money. After the tour, Otis goes back to Detroit with Lamont to visit his mother, who tells him that she has cancer. They then have a heart-to-heart on the porch.

In 1980, Melvin's legs are still recovering and the Temptations leave Atlantic Records. Eddie's success is starting to fade and he is reduced to playing in small nightclubs. While performing one night, Eddie spots David in the audience and once he finishes the song, brings David on stage and they sing together. After everyone leaves the club, Eddie and David have a drink at the bar and agree to start their own faction of the Temptations, along with Dennis Edwards, who was fired from the Temptations in 1978. Otis and Melvin move back to Detroit and go back under the Motown label and Shelly becomes their manager again. Not long after, Motown becomes interested in setting up a reunion tour between both sets of the Temptations.

By 1982, the tour is officially underway and both sets of Temptations come together to rehearse and become reacquainted. While on tour, Josephine calls and informs Otis that Lamont died in a construction accident. After Otis gets back from the funeral, the tour starts to fall apart, as Otis' grief gets the better of him and David's drug addiction starts to trigger his destructive nature.

In 1989, the Temptations are inducted into the Rock and Roll Hall of Fame. At the ceremony, Otis and Melvin are reunited with David, Eddie, and Dennis. And despite their past squabbles and rivalries, for one moment, they are all friends again as they accept  their honor and remember Paul.

In June 1991, a dead body is found in front of a hospital. After a week in the morgue, the body is finally identified as that of David Ruffin, dead of an apparent drug overdose. Eddie dies soon after of lung cancer in October 1992.

In February 1995, Otis and Melvin, now in a wheelchair, visit Melvin's mother. While preparing to eat dinner, Melvin, despite being in a wheelchair, volunteers to get short ribs from the kitchen. While he's gone, Melvin's mother thanks Otis for taking care of Melvin and keeping the Temptations together through all the good and bad times. The two then call for Melvin, but he doesn't respond. They go into the kitchen and find him unresponsive. Many people show up at the funeral, including Smokey Robinson, who sings his song "Really Gonna Miss You".

The film ends with the "classic five" Temptations (Otis, Melvin, Eddie, Paul, and David) in their youth, singing "My Girl" on a stage. At the end of the song, they take a bow, with Otis saying in a voice-over "Temptations, forever."

Afterwards
The miniseries was a ratings success with 45 million viewers in total watching the two-part series; the first half alone averaged a 15 rating/23 share in Nielsen ratings. Arkush won a 1999 Emmy award for Outstanding Directing for a Miniseries or a Movie. The miniseries has been subsequently rerun on the VH-1 cable television network and released to VHS and DVD. The VHS release notably omitted a few scenes which had previously aired on the television premiere. One such scene includes David Ruffin, clearly under the influence of drugs and his ego, becoming belligerent during a picnic celebration with the other members of the group. The removal of this scene is possibly due to the ensuing suit.

Otis Williams' ex-wife Josephine Miles, Melvin Franklin's mother Rose Franklin, Johnnie Mae Matthews, and on David Ruffin's behalf, the Ruffin family, filed suit against Williams, Shelly Berger, David V. Picker, Motown, De Passe Entertainment, Hallmark Entertainment, and NBC for use of their likenesses in the film, defamation of character, and emotional distress because of the inaccurate depictions of events. They also alleged that the miniseries misportrayed them and/or their relatives and twisted facts. The judges ruled in favor of the defendants, and the ruling was upheld when the plaintiffs appealed in 2001. Otis Williams later claimed that while his book was the source material for the film, he did not have a great deal of control over how the material was presented.

Cast

Classic Five Members and relatives
 Charles Malik Whitfield as Otis Williams, founder and leader of Otis Williams & the Distants and later co-founder (with Eddie Kendricks and Paul Williams, of The Primes) of the group that would become known as The Temptations. He conflicts with some of his group mates, particularly David Ruffin and Eddie Kendricks, over group leadership and other internal issues. Otis Williams is the only original member of The Temptations who is still living, and still performs with the group.
 Tina Lifford as Hazel, Otis' mother.
 Harold Surratt as Edgar, Otis' stepfather.
 Gina Ravera as Josephine (née Rogers), Otis' wife during the 1960s and the mother of their son Lamont.
Stevland Parks as Lamont, Otis and Josephine's son (portrayed at age 12)
 Chrystal Bates as Mrs. Rogers, Josephine's mother.
 D. B. Woodside as Melvin "Blue" Franklin, Otis' best friend, and a member of both Otis Williams & the Distants and The Temptations for over four decades. Shy and soft-spoken, he secretly struggles with arthritis over the years, & there is some implication that, as a result of his condition, he may be addicted to various pain medications.  Outside of founding member Otis Williams, Franklin was the only member of the Temptations who did not quit or get fired from the group during his tenure. Franklin died in 1995. 
 Jenifer Lewis as "Mama Rose", Melvin's mother.
 Terron Brooks as Eddie "Cornbread" Kendricks, a member of The Primes and The Temptations' original first tenor/falsetto and co-lead singer. After quitting the group in 1971, Eddie becomes a solo singer and later joins forces with fellow ex-Temptation David Ruffin. A lifelong chain smoker, Kendricks died of lung cancer in 1992 (this event is not portrayed in the miniseries, but is referenced near the end of Part Two).
 Christian Payton as Paul Williams, a member of The Primes and the Temptations' original lead singer, who succumbs to alcoholism and sickle cell anemia, forcing his retirement from the act in 1971. He committed suicide two years later.
 Rhonda Ross Kendrick as Maxine, Paul's wife
 Leon Robinson as David Ruffin, The Temptations' lead singer from 1964 to 1968, whose ego leads the others to force him out of the group. Addicted to cocaine & later crack, Ruffin died of a drug overdose in 1991. 
 Lamman Rucker as Jimmy Ruffin, David's older brother and a Motown performer.
 Nyjah Moore as Tammi Terrell, David's girlfriend and a Motown performer.

Other Temptations Members
 J. August Richards as Richard Street, a member of Otis Williams & the Distants, who later replaces Paul Williams in The Temptations.
 Charles Ley as Dennis Edwards, The Temptations' lead singer in the late 1960s and 1970s. He later joins forces with David and Eddie when they form a Temptations splinter group in the 1980s.
 Chaz Lamar Shepherd as Elbridge "Al"/"Bones" Bryant, Otis' high school friend and a member of both Otis Williams & the Distants and The Temptations. Having a day job as a milk man, Al becomes restless and moody as the Temptations struggle to find their big break, and is fired in December 1963.
 Benjamin J. Cain Jr. as Glenn Leonard, the Temptations' first tenor in the 1980s.
 Jonnie Brown as Damon Harris, the Temptations' first tenor in the 1970s after Eddie quits the act.

Others
 Alan Rosenberg as Shelly Berger, the Temptations' manager.
 Obba Babatundé as Berry Gordy, founder of Motown Records.
 Erik Michael Tristan as a young Smokey Robinson, the lead singer of The Miracles and The Temptations' primary songwriter and producer during the early 1960s.
The real-life Smokey Robinson appears as himself in a cameo at the end of Part Two, where he sings at Melvin's funeral.
 Vanessa Bell Calloway as Johnnie Mae Matthews, producer and manager for Otis Williams & the Distants.
 Mel Jackson as Norman Whitfield, The Temptations' primary producer and songwriter during the late 1960s and early 1970s.
 Adam Lazarre-White as Flynn, David's driver and self-appointed manager.
 Christopher Reid as Joltin' Joe, a radio DJ who summons The Distants for Johnnie Mae Matthews
 Bianca Lawson as Diana Ross of The Primettes/The Supremes.
 Melissa Mercedes Cardello as Florence Ballard of The Primettes/The Supremes. She begins an affair with Otis while on the Motor Town Revue in 1964.
 Taifa Harris as Mary Wilson of The Primettes/The Supremes.
 N'Tasha A. Pierre]as Martha Reeves, a Motown performer and secretary.
 Ricky Fanté as Marvin Gaye, a Motown performer.
 Russell Clark as Cholly Atkins, Motown's in-house choreographer.
 Vincent A. Ponder as James 'Pee-Wee' Crawford, a member of Otis Williams & the Distants.

Awards

Notes

  Eddie Kendricks died in October 1992.

References

Further reading

External links
 
 
 

1990s American television miniseries
African-American biographical dramas
African-American television
Films directed by Allan Arkush
Motown Productions films
The Temptations
Primetime Emmy Award-winning television series